The Cine Las Americas International Film Festival is an annual film festival based in Austin, Texas featuring Latin American and indigenous films from the Americas.  In its 14th year in 2011, the Festival has grown into a citywide event, with over 100 screenings in a nine-day span. Patrons of the festival are offered a wide variety of films to choose from including narrative and documentary features, short films, animation and youth films.

Organization
Cine Las Americas, a 501(c)(3) non-profit organization, is a multicultural organization that offers cultural experiences and business opportunities for Latinos in film and media arts, and brings media arts education to minority youth in Austin. While the international film festival seeks to become an institution in the international film business and trade, fostering multi-national film production, and accessing emerging markets and diverse audiences, Cine Las Americas remains a community oriented Media Arts Center, offering diverse opportunities for culture, education and fun.

Festival history
The Cine Las Americas International Film festival began in 1997 as a Cuban film retrospective sponsored by the Mexic-Arte Museum in Austin, Texas. While programming the initial event, the organizers realized that although Austin was building its reputation as an important city for producing and showcasing independent film, films made by and about Latinos were largely absent from the community's cultural landscape. In 2001, Cine Las Americas partnered with the Austin Independent School District (AISD) and moved the organization's offices to Johnston High School in East Austin, where it established a Media Arts Center, implementing educational and mentoring programs to support the District's Dropout Prevention Campaign. During this time the organization offered the school's students hands-on bilingual opportunities in multimedia production, event production, and non-profit organization management.

Festival-related programs and milestones
The training students received in the Cine Las Americas-school district partnership culminated in students producing Emergencia, the youth component of the film festival. In Emergencia they receive entries from around the country, preview them in order to curate a program, grant awards for the best work, and produce a day of free screenings within the context of the festival. Emergencia remains a special competitive section of the festival open to filmmakers ages 19 and under and is curated by students participating in Cine Las Americas' multicultural Media Literacy programs.

In 2003, professional musicians and other guest artists began to instruct and mentor dozens of students at a recording studio inside the organization's classroom at the school. There, students were able to write and record music and lyrics in a professional studio environment within a bilingual Digital Music Production curriculum in the after-school program BeatLab. Many students have used skills learned there in preparing work for subsequent Festivals. BeatLab has continued at other area schools since the organization's offices moved to East Austin after its contract with the school expired.

Also in 2003, the festival extended its program to include indigenous work from the Americas, established competitive sections granting juried and audience awards.

By 2005, the organization had presented more than 300 films at the annual Festival and at various screenings throughout Texas, collaborating with institutions such as The Museum of Fine Arts, Houston (MFAH), the South By Southwest film festival (SXSW), and the Austin Film Festival.

In 2007, the Festival expanded to its current format in celebration of Cine Las Americas' 10th anniversary.

The 13th annual Cine Las Americas International Film Festival was held April 21–29, 2010, and featured Mexico as the invited country in celebration of Mexico's bicentennial.

2009 awards

Jury Award for Best Narrative Feature: 
El truco del manco (The Handless Trick) 
Director:  Santiago Zannou, Spain, 2008

Jury Award for Best Documentary Feature:
Intimidades de Shakespeare y Víctor Hugo (Shakespeare and Victor Hugo's Intimacies)
Director:  Yulene Olaizola, Mexico, 2008

Special Jury Award for Documentary Feature:
Unidad 25 (Unit 25)
Director:  Alejo Hoijman, Argentina / Spain, 2008

Jury Award for Best Narrative Short Film:
Danzak
Director:  Gabriela Yepes, Peru / USA, 2008

Special Jury Award for Narrative Short Film:
Saliva
Director:  Esmir Filho, Brazil, 2007

Jury Award for Best Documentary Short Film:
Conversations II
Director:  Marianela Vega Oroza, Peru / USA, 2007

Audience Award for Best Narrative Feature:
Cinco días sin Nora (Nora's Will)
Director:  Mariana Chenillo, Mexico, 2008

Audience Award for Best Documentary Feature:
El General
Director:  Natalia Almada, Mexico, 2009

Emergencia Youth Competition, Jury Award for Best Film:
Journeys Through the Red, White and Blue: Brian's Journey
Andrea Williams, USA, 2008

2008 awards

JURY AWARD WINNERS:

Jury Award for Best First or Second Narrative Feature
NOEL POETA DA VILA (NOEL, THE SAMBA POET), Ricardo van Steen, Brazil, 2006

Jury Award for Best Narrative Short
MEXICAN DREAM, David Michan, Mexico, 2007

Special Jury Mention for Narrative Short
EN TRÁNSITO (IN TRANSIT), Isabel Muñoz Cota Callejas, México, 2007

Jury Award for Best Documentary Feature
LA AMERICANA (THE AMERICAN), Nicholas Bruckman, USA, 2008

Special Jury Mention for Documentary Feature
LOS PUÑOS DE UNA NACIÓN (THE FISTS OF A NATION), Pituka Ortega Heilbron, Panama, 2006

Jury Award for Best Documentary Short
CON EL TOQUE DE LA CHAVETA (WITH A STROKE OF THE CHAVETA), Pamela Sporn, Cuba, USA, 2007

Special Jury Mention for Documentary Short
POR MIS HIJOS (FOR THEM), Aymée Cruzalegui, Spain, 2007

AUDIENCE AWARD WINNERS:

Audience Award for Best Narrative Feature
NAO POR ACASO (NOT BY CHANCE), Philippe Barcinski, Brazil, Drama, 2007

Audience Award for Best Documentary Feature
LA AMERICANA (THE AMERICAN), Nicholas Bruckman, USA, 2008

Earlier winners
Best Documentary Feature 2006: 
De NADIE, Tin Dirdamal, 2006
De NADIE went on to win many other awards including the Audience Award, Sundance Film Festival 2006, and Mexican Ariele award for Best Feature Documentary, 2006.

References

External links
 Festival official site
 Festival videos on YouTube

Film festivals in Austin, Texas
Hispanic and Latino American culture in Austin, Texas
Native American film festivals
Latin American film festivals